Chris Wilson (born July 10, 1982) is a Canadian football defensive end who is now retired. He began his professional career with the BC Lions after signing as an undrafted free agent in 2005. He spent five seasons in the National Football League (NFL) with the Washington Redskins and Philadelphia Eagles before re-signing with the Lions. He played college football for Northwood University. He is a member of Iota Phi Theta fraternity.

Professional career

BC Lions
Wilson signed with the BC Lions in 2005 and was part of the BC Lions' defensive line in their 2006 Grey Cup victory.

Washington Redskins
On January 3, 2007, Wilson signed with the Washington Redskins for a reported three-year contract. In the 2007 season, his rookie season in the NFL, he finished with 13 tackles and four sacks.

Wilson recorded 20 tackles and one sack in the 2009 season.

Initially, Wilson played as a defensive end for the Redskins, but transitioned to outside linebacker when the team switched to a 3-4 defense in the 2010 season.

Philadelphia Eagles
The Philadelphia Eagles signed Wilson on August 8, 2011. He was released during final cuts on September 2, 2011.

Second stint with Redskins
On April 24, 2012, Wilson signed a one-year contract with Washington Redskins and competed with Markus White and Rob Jackson for one of the backup roles at outside linebacker. After performing well in the preseason games, he made the final 53-man roster by the start of the 2012 season.

Return to BC Lions
On September 9, 2013, the BC Lions announced that Wilson had re-signed with the team.

Coaching
Wilson interned as a special teams and linebackers coach for the Pittsburgh Steelers during the 2017 NFL training camp.  He served as the head football coach of the Flint Jaguars, the remaining high school team in the Flint, Michigan community.  Wilson also served as the defensive coordinator and special teams coordinator for Vermilion Community College.

Wilson is currently serving as director and head football coach for 475 Elite Training’s Youth Football Club. 

Wilson also serves as a youth pastor at Church of the Harvest International.

References

External links
Just Sports Stats
Washington Redskins bio
BC Lions bio

1982 births
Living people
American football defensive ends
American football linebackers
American players of Canadian football
BC Lions players
Canadian football defensive linemen
Northwood Timberwolves football players
Philadelphia Eagles players
Players of American football from Flint, Michigan
Sportspeople from Flint, Michigan
Washington Redskins players